Josefina Samper Rojas (8 May 1927 – 13 February 2018) was a Spanish syndicalist and feminist, member of the Communist Party of Spain, and spouse of Marcelino Camacho.

Biography 
Born in Fondón on 8 May 1927, when she was three years old her father, a miner, emigrated to Oran, Algeria, joining the rest of her family a year later. There, Josefina took care of her sister while her mother worked washing clothes in the houses. Later, Josefina went to work as a trouser dresser in a clothing workshop. At age 12 she started militancy in the Unified Socialist Youth, and at 14 she joined the PCE at the hands of Roberto Carrillo, brother of Santiago Carrillo.

As a party activist, Josefina participated in the distribution of the España Popular publications. She also organized the children of the neighborhood to warn using cans as a drum every time the police arrived in search of the hidden Republicans. She also created a kind of cooperative dedicated to the manufacture of raffia shoes with which she helped to maintain her house, as well as that of many other families, mostly of political emigrants. Josefina was responsible for getting the raffia. The benefits were divided according to the pairs of shoes they made, with Josefina obtaining the lowest profits.

Work with Marcelino Camacho 

Soon, together with other women, she formed a support group for immigrants and political refugees, which, in 1944, led her to receive, on behalf of the party, the task of organizing an aperitif for three prisoners fled from the concentration camp. That is how she met Marcelino Camacho,  with whom she married on December 22, 1948 and who had two children, Yenia and Marcel. In 1957, after the pardon of Marcelino, they returned from exile, moving to the neighborhood of Carabanchel, in Madrid, in a modest apartment where they lived until, already in 2010, Marcelino's health forced them to move to another floor in Majadahonda. In his neighborhood of Carabanchel both continued their clandestine political and trade union activity that led to the successive imprisonment of Marcelino. It was then that Josefina and other women, some wives of prisoners and others simply Communist women, mobilized, creating in 1965 the Women's Democratic Movement, germen of the current feminist movement, dedicated to fighting, inside and outside of Spain, to help political prisoners, achieving certain improvements in the conditions in which they were confined. During these years, Josefina gave up looking for a job outside the home, because she needed to dedicate all her time to the cause, so her children, Yenia and Marcel, took responsibility for taking the salary to the family home, while Josefina spent the little time she had to sew pants for a tailor shop and knit sweaters for a wool store.

Thus began a new life outside the clandestine life that allowed them to rekindle the political and union struggle that Josefina still maintained a few years after the death of Marcelino.

Later years

After the death of Marcelino Camacho on 29 October 2010, Josefina maintained a great activity as a transmitter of the memory and voice of her husband, offering frequent talks throughout Spain, helping to inspire the struggle for workers' rights to the new generations. She died on 13 February 2018.

References

1927 births
2018 deaths
Communist Party of Spain politicians
Spanish socialist feminists
Spanish communists
Spanish feminists
Spanish trade unionists
People from the Province of Almería